Szczyrzyc Abbey is a Cistercian abbey founded in 1234 in the village of Szczyrzyc, Poland. It continues to function as a monastery and is one of the Polish Shrines to the Virgin Mary.

Apart from its religious role, the abbey contains the Museum of the Cistercian Abbey.

Cistercian monasteries in Poland
Limanowa County
13th-century establishments in Poland
Christian monasteries established in the 13th century
Churches in Lesser Poland Voivodeship
Religious organizations established in the 1230s